Beng Spies is an American voice actor.

Roles

Television

Video games

References

External links
 

Living people
Place of birth missing (living people)
Year of birth missing (living people)
American male voice actors